Mogens Brandt (1 March 1909 – 21 January 1970) was a Danish film actor. He appeared in 33 films between 1944 and 1969. He was born in Copenhagen, Denmark and died in Denmark.

Filmography

Mordets melodi - 1944
De tre skolekammerater - 1944
De røde enge - 1945
I går og i morgen - 1945
Far betaler - 1946
 The Swedenhielm Family - 1947
Kristinus Bergman - 1948
Tre år efter - 1948
Det var på Rundetårn - 1955
Den store gavtyv - 1956
Hidden Fear - 1957
Skarpe skud i Nyhavn - 1957
Seksdagesløbet - 1958
Krudt og klunker - 1958
Vi er allesammen tossede - 1959
Skibet er ladet med - 1960
Soldaterkammerater på vagt - 1960
Panik i paradis - 1960
Peters baby - 1961
Reptilicus - 1961
Soldaterkammerater på efterårsmanøvre - 1961
Cirkus Buster - 1961
Prinsesse for en dag - 1962
Ih, du forbarmende - 1964
Mord for åbent tæppe - 1964
Når enden er go''' - 1964Pigen og millionæren - 1965Mor bag rattet - 1965Det er ikke appelsiner - det er heste - 1967Elsk din næste - 1967Nyhavns glade gutter - 1967Fup eller fakta - 1967Dyrlægens plejebørn - 1968Mig og min lillebror og storsmuglerne - 1968Sonja - 16 år'' - 1969

External links

1909 births
1970 deaths
Danish male film actors
Male actors from Copenhagen
20th-century Danish male actors